Bob Stoloff (20 August 1952 in New York) is an American jazz musician (vocals , drums first , composition) and teacher.

Career 
Stoloff, who grew up first in Port Washington, as a teenager played numerous instruments and from 1967 to 1969, the High School of Music & Art in New York City graduated, then worked as a musician. He studied 1974-1976 at the Berklee College of Music percussion, also began at this time but to sing. In the next few years he worked as a studio musician and played as drummer sideman on numerous albums.

In 1983 he was appointed to the Berklee College, where he taught scat. In 1984, he was (at the time Urszula Dudziak, Jay Clayton, Jeanne Lee and partially Bobby McFerrin included) with the Vocal Summit tour in Europe. In addition, he has also performed with Joey Blake and Bobby McFerrin.

He presented a number of textbooks on jazz singing and teaching continues as Associate Professor at Berklee College, where he was deputy head of the Voice Department. In addition, he also directed the vocal training at the Universidad San Francisco de Quito in Ecuador. He can be heard on recordings with the Jazz Harp Trio and the Boston group The Ritz.

Bob Stoloff Vocal Jazz Academies 
Along the years he has opened several vocal jazz academies in different parts of the world: in Rome, Italy, in Rotterdam, Netherlands, and in Avilés, Spain.

Publications 
 Scat! Vocal Improvisation Techniques (Gerard/Sarzin; mit CD) 
 Blues Scatitudes (Gerard/Sarzin)
 Body Beats (Advance Music)
 Vocal Improvisation: An Instru-Vocal Approach for Soloists, Groups, and Choirs (Hal Leonard/Berklee Press)
 Rhythmania! (CD)
 Recipes for Soloing over Jazz Standards Vol. 1

References

External links 
 Official website
 Interview (Jazz Times)
 Bob Stoloff in Encyclopedia of Jazz Musicians
 

Living people
American jazz singers
Berklee College of Music alumni
American jazz percussionists
1952 births
Singers from New York (state)
Berklee College of Music faculty